Fred Williams (February 8, 1929 – October 9, 2000) was an American professional football player who was a defensive lineman in the National Football League (NFL) for the Chicago Bears and Washington Redskins.  He went to four Pro Bowls during his 14-year career.  Williams played college football at the University of Arkansas and was drafted in the fifth round of the 1952 NFL Draft.

Early life
Williams was born in Little Rock, Arkansas and attended Little Rock Central High School.  While attending Little Rock Central, he played high school football and was a two-time All-State selection.  While in high school, Williams also won championships in basketball and boxing.

College career
Williams attended and played college football at the University of Arkansas.  He played in the 1952 Chicago College All-Star Game.  Williams was also a boxing and wrestling champion while attending Arkansas.

Professional career
Williams was drafted in the fifth round of the 1952 NFL Draft by the Chicago Bears, where he played from 1952 to 1963 and was part of the Bears' 1963 NFL Championship team. He played defensive end and tackle with sporadic appearances at linebacker, a versatility that Chicago Tribune writer Cooper Rollow suggested led to his lack of accolades as he was never named All-Pro. Nicknamed "Fat Freddy", he was popular among fans and media for his humor, frequently joking about various team-related situations; in 1959, when asked if the Bears' defensive line was the best in the league, he remarked, "I don't know if we're the best, but we sure are the ugliest."

In 1964, he was traded to the Washington Redskins, along with Angelo Coia, for the Redskins' sixth overall pick in the 1965 NFL Draft, which they used to select Steve DeLong. When the Redskins played Williams' former team that year, he was involved in a fight with Bears center Mike Pyle after Williams jumped offside and hit Pyle in the head with his forearm. Williams spent two seasons in Washington.

Personal
After retiring from the NFL, Williams became a liquor salesman. He died from a stroke on October 9, 2000, in Heber Springs, Arkansas.

References

External links
 

1929 births
2000 deaths
American football defensive linemen
Arkansas Razorbacks football players
Chicago Bears players
Little Rock Central High School alumni
Washington Redskins players
Western Conference Pro Bowl players
Sportspeople from Little Rock, Arkansas
People from Heber Springs, Arkansas